Molt is an unincorporated rural village located in Stillwater County, Montana, United States, 
which has a post office ZIP code (59057) and several granaries. A hardware store still stands, which stood as the Prairie Winds cafe for many years; today the building remains unoccupied.

The village elevation is 3,966 feet. Molt appears on the Molt U.S. Geological Survey Map.

History

Molt thrived as a busy and well developed agricultural community on the edge of Yellowstone County. Several large grain elevators were erected and a few historic buildings are still standing today. The Northern Pacific Railway had a stop in Molt en route to Hesper, Wheat Basin and Rapelje, Montana.

Although the town has declined significantly with the withdrawal of the railroad, a few of its elevators are still in operation.

A post office was first established in the Molt area in 1909. The office was originally known as Stickley and was located on a nearby ranch. In 1918, the office was moved to town and the name changed to Molt (named for the person who donated the land for the townsite).

References

Unincorporated communities in Yellowstone County, Montana
Unincorporated communities in Montana